The World of Interiors is a magazine published by Condé Nast with a total readership of 152,000. The glossy monthly magazine covers interior design.

History

The magazine began  as Interiors in November 1981. It was founded in London, England, by Kevin Kelly, with Min Hogg as editor. Its unusual interiors and literate style set it apart from other interior titles, and within two years the magazine had been bought by Condé Nast and it began publishing internationally under the name The World of Interiors (as there was already an American competitor named Interiors. Since 2000, it was edited by Rupert Thomas, who had been the deputy editor since 1997. On 17 September 2021, it was announced that Hamish Bowles would become the new editor in chief at The World of Interiors. The magazine has only had three editors during its 41-year history. 

Fifty percent of readers work in design-related industries.

Content
The focus of The World of Interiors has been described as "startlingly beautiful things" and a "gorgeous physical object". It has continued to mix high and low interiors, historical and modern interiors. Domestic houses, church interiors and historical palaces have all been covered.
In addition to photographic features of interiors, the magazine has "an editorial mix that has retained its eclecticism, wit and attention to every word."

References

External links 
 

1981 establishments in the United Kingdom
Condé Nast magazines
Design magazines
English-language magazines
Magazines established in 1981
Magazines published in London
Monthly magazines published in the United Kingdom
Visual arts magazines published in the United Kingdom